Paul Edward Clarke (23 January 1909 – 12 November 1969) was an Australian rules footballer who played with North Melbourne in the Victorian Football League (VFL).

Notes

External links 

1909 births
1969 deaths
Australian rules footballers from Victoria (Australia)
North Melbourne Football Club players